Lorys Bourelly (born 27 May 1992) is a French swimmer. He competed in the men's 4 × 200 metre freestyle relay event at the 2016 Summer Olympics.

References

External links
 

1992 births
Living people
Martiniquais swimmers
Olympic swimmers of France
Swimmers at the 2016 Summer Olympics
Universiade medalists in swimming
Sportspeople from Fort-de-France
Universiade bronze medalists for France
Medalists at the 2011 Summer Universiade
French male freestyle swimmers